The Horace H. Rackham School of Graduate Studies, commonly known as the Rackham Graduate School, is the graduate school of the University of Michigan. Founded in 1912 with an endowment from Mary Rackham in 1935, the Rackham Graduate School is responsible for Michigan's almost all graduate degree and certificate programs. The school offers more than 180 master's and doctorate degree programs.The Rackham Graduate School is housed in the Rackham Education Memorial Building. The building was designed by William Kapp of the firm Smith, Hinchman & Grylls with architectural sculpture by Corrado Parducci.

References

External links
 

Educational institutions established in 1912
1912 establishments in Michigan
University of Michigan schools, colleges, and departments
Graduate schools in the United States
Buildings with sculpture by Corrado Parducci
University of Michigan campus